William Armour Dixon (February 1887 – 1964), known as Will Dixon or Arthur Dixon, was an English professional footballer who played in the Football League for Fulham, Plymouth Argyle and Barrow. He played as an outside left.

Dixon was born in Newcastle upon Tyne, and played local football in that area before joining Fulham. He made his Football League debut for that club during the 1908–09 season, but that was his only League appearance. He moved to Plymouth Argyle, then a Southern League club, in 1910, and made nearly 200 appearances for the club either side of the First World War. Dixon played in Argyle's first game in the Football League, as the Southern League Division One clubs were absorbed to form the Football League Third Division for the 1920–21 season, and was involved in the buildup to their first Football League goal, scored by Jimmy Heeps. He finished his League career the following season with four games for Barrow in the newly formed Third Division North.

Dixon's brothers Andrew and Joseph were also on Argyle's books, but never appeared for the first team. Dixon died in 1964.

References

1887 births
1964 deaths
Footballers from Newcastle upon Tyne
English footballers
Association football outside forwards
Willington Athletic F.C. players
Newcastle City F.C. players
Fulham F.C. players
Plymouth Argyle F.C. players
Barrow A.F.C. players
English Football League players
Southern Football League players
Date of death missing
Place of death missing